Candesartan is an angiotensin receptor blocker used mainly for the treatment of high blood pressure and congestive heart failure. Candesartan has a very low maintenance dose. The metabolism for the drug is unique as it is a cascading prodrug. Candesartan has good bioavailibility and is more potent among the AT-1 receptor antagonists.

It was patented in 1990 and approved for medical use in 1997.

Medical uses

Hypertension
As with other angiotensin II receptor antagonists, candesartan is indicated for the treatment of hypertension. Candesartan has an additive antihypertensive effect when combined with a diuretic, such as chlorthalidone. It is available in a fixed-combination formulation with a low dose of the thiazide diuretic hydrochlorothiazide. Candesartan/hydrochlorothiazide combination preparations are marketed under various trade names including Atacand Plus, Hytacand, Blopress Plus, Advantec and Ratacand Plus.

Congestive heart failure
Angiotensin receptor blockers such as candesartan and valsartan have been demonstrated in randomised controlled trials to reduce heart failure hospitalisations and cardiovascular deaths for chronic heart failure patients with reduced left ventricular ejection fraction (LVEF ≤40%) and are intolerant to angiotensin-converting enzyme inhibitors.

Prehypertension
In a four-year randomized controlled trial, candesartan was compared to placebo to see whether it could prevent or postpone the development of full-blown hypertension in people with so-called prehypertension. During the first two years of the trial, half of participants were given candesartan while the other half received placebo; candesartan reduced the risk of developing hypertension by nearly two-thirds during this period. In the last two years of the study, all participants were switched to placebo. By the end of the study, candesartan had significantly reduced the risk of hypertension, by more than 15%. Serious adverse effects were more common among participants receiving placebo than in those given candesartan.

Prevention of atrial fibrillation
Results from a meta-analysis completed in 2005 demonstrated a reduction in atrial fibrillation in patients with systolic left ventricular dysfunction treated with candesartan, another angiotensin receptor blocker or an angiotensin converting enzyme inhibitor. Evidence for the use of candesartan specifically is also supported by an analysis of the CHARM study which demonstrated a reduction in atrial fibrillation in patients with systolic left ventricular dysfunction. While these studies have demonstrated a potential additional benefit for candesartan when used in patients with systolic left ventricular dysfunction, additional studies are required to further elucidate the role of candesartan in the prevention of atrial fibrillation in other population groups.

Diabetic retinopathy
Use of antihypertensive drugs has been demonstrated to slow the progression of diabetic retinopathy; the role of candesartan specifically in reducing progression in type 1 and type 2 diabetes is still up for debate. Results from a 2008 study on patients with type 1 diabetes showed there was no benefit in using candesartan to reduce progression of diabetic retinopathy when compared to placebo. Candesartan has been demonstrated to reverse the severity (cause regression) of mild to moderate diabetic retinopathy in patients with type 2 diabetes. The patient populations investigated in these studies were limited to mostly Caucasians and those younger than 75 years of age, so generalization of these findings to other population groups should be done with caution.

Migraine prophylaxis
In two small randomised, controlled cross-over studies, candesartan was shown to be effective for the prophylaxis of migraine; however, further studies would enhance confidence in its use for this indication.

Adverse effects
As with other drugs that inhibit the renin–angiotensin system, if candesartan is taken by pregnant women during the second or third trimester, it can cause injury and in some cases, death of the developing fetus. Symptomatic hypotension may occur in people who take candesartan and are volume-depleted or salt-depleted, as can also occur when diuretics are coadministered. Reduction in renal glomerular filtration rate may occur; people with renal artery stenosis may be at higher risk. Hyperkalemia may occur; people who are also taking spironolactone or eplerenone may be at higher risk.

Anemia may occur, due to inhibition of the renin–angiotensin system.

As with other angiotensin receptor blockers, candesartan can rarely cause severe liver injury.

Chemistry and pharmacokinetics
Candesartan is marketed as the cyclohexyl 1-hydroxyethyl carbonate (cilexetil) ester, known as candesartan cilexetil. Candesartan cilexetil is metabolised completely by esterases in the intestinal wall during absorption to the active candesartan moiety.  The first step that occurs in the cascading pro-drug mechanism of Candesartan is that the carbonate gets hydrolyzed. The carbonate gets hydrolyzed and releases carbon dioxide. The metabolite at this step is cyclohexanol, and this is a relatively non-toxic compound which is advantageous to the design of the drug.  The other aspect of the cascading prodrug is the O-CH-CH3 molecule which becomes converted into acetic acid, which is another product from the cascading side reaction. Similar to the insight from cyclohexanol, the metabolite of acetic acid relatively is non-toxic and thus less of a hazard if produced as the drug takes pharmacologic action.

The use of a prodrug form increases the bioavailability of candesartan. Despite this, absolute bioavailability is relatively poor at 15% (candesartan cilexetil tablets) to 40% (candesartan cilexetil solution). Its IC50 is 15 μg/kg. Candesartan is not administered in its active form because the administration of the pro-drug would require greater doses and has an unfavorable adverse event profile.

History

The compound known as TCV-116 (candesartan) was studied by Japanese scientists using standard laboratory rats. Animal studies were published showing the effectiveness of the compound in 1992–1993, with a pilot study on humans published in the summer of 1993.

Names
The prodrug candesartan cilexetil is marketed by AstraZeneca and Takeda Pharmaceuticals, commonly under the trade names Blopress, Atacand, Amias, and Ratacand. It is available in generic form.

References

Angiotensin II receptor antagonists
Tetrazoles
Benzimidazoles
Ethers
Carboxylic acids
Biphenyls
AstraZeneca brands
Takeda Pharmaceutical Company brands